The 2014 Grozny bombing was a terrorist attack in the city of Grozny, Chechen Republic, Russia. On October 5, 2014, a 19-year-old man named Opti Mudarov went to the town hall where an event was taking place to mark Grozny City Day celebrations coinciding with the birthday of Chechen President Ramzan Kadyrov. Police officers noticed him acting strangely and stopped him. The officers began to search him and the bomb which Mudarov had been carrying exploded. Five officers, along with the suicide bomber, were killed, while 12 others were wounded.

References

21st-century mass murder in Russia
Terrorist incidents in Russia in 2014
Suicide bombings in Russia
Mass murder in 2014
Insurgency in the North Caucasus
History of Grozny
Islamic terrorism in Russia
Islamic terrorist incidents in 2014
October 2014 events in Russia
Building bombings in Russia